The Embassy of Georgia in Kyiv is the diplomatic mission of Georgia in Ukraine.

History 
In early September 1918 in Kyiv, after talks with the government of Ukraine began operating Diplomatic Mission of Georgia, appointed ambassador Victor Tevzaya. and his deputy David Vacheishvili. The composition of the embassy were first and second secretaries, the consular, military attaché assistant economics department, press office. In the administrative and technical staff were Commandant home typists, translators, car driver, couriers, utility workers and others, only 20 people

Diplomatic relations between Georgia and Ukraine were established on 21 July 1992. April 5, 1994 began work Embassy of Ukraine in Georgia, August 19, 1994 - Embassy of Georgia in Kyiv.

Consulate General of Georgia 
 Consulate General of Georgia in Odesa, Leo Tolstoy str, 30, Odesa, Ukraine 
 Honorary Consulate of Georgia in Yalta
 Honorary Consulate of Georgia in Zhytomyr
 Honorary Consulate of Georgia in Lviv

Previous Ambassadors

 Victor Tevzaia (09.1918-09.1919)
 Valeriy Chechelashvili (05.07.1994-04.10.1998);
 Malkhaz Chachava (16.12.1998-13.10.2000);
 Grigol Katamadze (31.10.2000 – 2007);.
 Merab Antadze (01.11.2007 – 2008);
 Grigol Katamadze (01.01.2009 - 2013).
 Mikheil Ukleba (2013 - 2017)
 Gela Dumbadze (2017 - 2019)
 Teimuraz Sharashenidze (2019 - 2021)
 Georgy Zakarashvili (2021 - )

See also 
 Georgia–Ukraine relations
 Foreign relations of Georgia (country)
 Foreign relations of Ukraine
 Embassy of Ukraine, Tbilisi
 Diplomatic missions in Ukraine
 Diplomatic missions of Georgia (country)

References

External links 
 Embassy of Georgia in Kyiv
 Ministry of Foreign Affairs of Ukraine

Diplomatic missions in Kyiv
Kyiv
Georgia (country)–Ukraine relations